is a former Japanese football player.

Playing career
Yoshida was born in Saitama Prefecture on December 18, 1970. After graduating from high school, he joined Nissan Motors (later Yokohama Marinos) in 1990. Through reserve team, he joined top team in 1992. However he could hardly play in the match. In 1995, he moved to Japan Football League (JFL) club Otsuka Pharmaceutical and he played as regular player. In 1998, he moved to JFL club Ventforet Kofu. Although he did not play in the match in 1998 season, the club was promoted to new league J2 League in 1999. From 1999, he played many matches and retired end of 2001 season.

Club statistics

Managerial statistics

References

External links

jsgoal.jp

1970 births
Living people
Association football people from Saitama Prefecture
Japanese footballers
J1 League players
J2 League players
Japan Football League (1992–1998) players
Yokohama F. Marinos players
Tokushima Vortis players
Ventforet Kofu players
Association football forwards
Japanese football managers
Nara Club managers